"Midnight" is a song by English singer-songwriter Jessie Ware. It was written by Pop Wansel, Kiah Victoria, Jessie Ware, Jordan Thomas and Bastian Langebaek, with production handled by the latter one. The song was released via Island Records on 28 July 2017, as the lead single from the singer-songwriter's third studio album, Glasshouse (2017).

Background
Ware first revealed the details of the song during a live performance in London on 2 July 2017. She released a snippet of the song on 25 and 27 July 2017 respectively. On 27 July 2017, Ware debuted the song via Annie Mac's self-titled radio show on BBC Radio 1, and was named as Mac's "hottest record in the world". The track was described as "fantasy mixed with complete and utter desire" in the press release. Ware said "Midnight" "is the song I've always wanted to be able to sing but perhaps didn't have the confidence until now".

Critical reception
Christopher Roberts of Under the Radar opined that "the strong production and Ware's powerhouse vocals elevate "Midnight" to a superior pop song". Joanna Agwanda of Uproxx felt that the song "highlights Ware's amazing vocal ability". Robin Murray of Clash opined that the song is "a storming piece of modern soul". Michelle Geslani of Consequence of Sound wrote: "Equal parts confessional, haunting, and elegant, it finds Ware reflecting on her relationship with her husband." Mike Wass of Idolator described the song as a "soulful anthem" and an "instantly catchy tack", as well as "a record for adults that explores the initial rush of new love and sounds very much like a throwback to another era". Hafeezah Nazim of Nylon wrote that the song "is laden with soaring falsettos that echo Maxwell's "This Woman's Work" over a piano-driven production". Sam Murphy of The Interns wrote that Ware "pushed vocally more than she ever has before" and "revealed even further the strength in her voice" with the song, and regarded it as "a classy, elegant affair". Jamie Milton DIY wrote that the song "starts off as a fragile, skeletal number with hazy ethereal synths, but soon develops into a full-on soul stomper, with confident piano chords and percussion". Megan Reynolds of Jezebel opined that the single is "not much of a departure from her typical ethereal heartbreak jams, but still a good one".

Track listing

Credits and personnel
Credits adapted from Tidal.

 Jessie Ware – writing, vocals
 Pop Wansel – writing, co-producing, programming
 Kiah Victoria – writing, background vocals, vocal arranging
 Bastian Langebaek – writing, producing, engineering, keyboard, background vocals, programming, vocal arranging
 Jordan Thomas – writing, engineering, background vocals, vocal arranging
 Induce – mastering engineering
 Jack Chown – engineering
 Brendon Harding – engineering
 Joseph Gallagher – engineering
 Spike Stent – mixing

Charts

Release history

References

2017 songs
2017 singles
Jessie Ware songs
Island Records singles
Songs written by Jessie Ware
Songs written by Pop Wansel